The 2019 Asian Youth Athletics Championships was the third edition of the biennial, continental athletics competition for Asian athletes aged 15 to 17. It was held at the Tseung Kwan O Sports Ground in Hong Kong from 15 to 17 March. Organised by the Hong Kong Amateur Athletic Association, a total of forty events will be contested with the events divided evenly between the sexes. The host was announced in January 2019 by Asian Athletics Association.

Each Federation can enter maximum of 2 athletes in each individual event, while host team can enter maximum of 3 athletes in each individual event.  For relay event, each Federation can only enter 1 team to participate.

This championship was the first large scale competition situated in Hong Kong since the 2009 East Asian Games. Kwan Kee, the Chairman of Hong Kong Amateur Athletics Association was satisfied with the performance of Hong Kong team (1 gold medal and 2 silver medals) and planned to bid for more international track and field events to promote the growth of this sport in Hong Kong.

Medal summary

Men

Women

Medal table

References

External links
 2019 Asian Youth Athletics Championships Official website
 Asian Athletics Association website

Asian Youth Athletics Championships
International sports competitions hosted by Hong Kong
Asian Youth Athletics Championships
Asian Youth Athletics Championships
Asian Athletics Championships
Asian Youth Athletics Championships